The National Hangeul Museum was established in 2014 in the Yongsan District of Seoul (South Korea) near the National Museum of Korea.

The museum has a basement level with an auditorium and three ground levels with lecture rooms, a library, a permanent exhibition hall, a special exhibition hall as well as a Hangeul Learning Center and a Children's Museum with a Hangeul playground.

There is plenty of text in English for non-Korean speakers, along with interactive games and audio-visual displays highlighting elements of Hangeul and providing basic reading and writing skills.

Literature
 Ottar Grepstad: Language Museums of the World. Centre for Norwegian Language and Literature, Ørsta 2018,

Gallery

References

External links 

 National Hangeul Museum Website (engl.)

Museums in Seoul
National museums of South Korea
Hangul
History museums in South Korea
Museums established in 2014
2014 establishments in South Korea
Buildings and structures in Yongsan District